Helena Mikołajczyk (born 22 May 1968) is a Polish biathlete. She competed in two events at the 1994 Winter Olympics.

References

External links
 

1968 births
Living people
Biathletes at the 1994 Winter Olympics
Polish female biathletes
Olympic biathletes of Poland
People from Limanowa County